Vimperk is a town in Prachatice District in the South Bohemian Region of the Czech Republic. It has about 7,300 inhabitants. The town centre is well preserved and is protected by law as an urban monument zone.

Historically Vimperk has been known as an important regional trade centre, being located on the Golden Trail from Passau to Prachatice. Vimperk is also renowned for its glass-making and printing traditions.

Administrative parts
Vimperk is made up of three town parts and 19 villages:

Vimperk I
Vimperk II
Vimperk III
Arnoštka
Bořanovice
Boubská
Cejsice
Hrabice
Klášterec
Korkusova Huť
Křesanov
Lipka
Michlova Huť
Modlenice
Pravětín
Skláře
Solná Lhota
Sudslavice
U Sloupů
Veselka
Vnarovy
Výškovice

Geography
The southern half of the municipal territory lies the Bohemian Forest and is protected as the Šumava Protected Landscape Area, the northern part lies in the Bohemian Forest Foothills. The town is situated in the Volyňka River valley.

Climate
Vimperk enjoys a version of humid Continental climate (Dfb) with cool and wet conditions year-round. Although frequently falling precipitations are mostly in the form of rain, totalling 940 mm, yet also many snow falls. There are four pronounced seasons with quite cold, wet, and relatively sunny winter season, which is replaced during April with sunnier and even wetter warm seasons continuing until October when winter season starts again.

History

The whole area was covered by deep forest until the middle of the 13th century, when the Vimperk Castle was founded. The castle was most likely founded by King Ottokar II to protect the border and the new branch of the Golden Trail, the important trade route from Passau to Bohemia. In the 1260s, Ottokar II lent the manor and the castle, which included the walled fortress with a tower house and a palace, to the noble family of Janovic. In 1370, the properties of Janovic family forfeited to the royal crown.

From the end of the 14th century, Vimperk manor was a property of the noblemen Kaplíři of Sulevice. During their rule, the settlement and the castle were merged into a single fortified unit and an outpost, mighty round tower Haselburg, was built. Despite the era of Hussite Wars, Vimperk prospered, and in 1479, it was granted the town rights by King Vladislaus II. After it was owned by Malovci of Chýnov for a short period, Vimperk was acquired by the Rosenberg family in the 16th century. During their rule, tha trade on the Golden Trail reached its peak. Probably during the 16th century the castle began to be rebuilt into the Renaissance chateau.

During the war in 1547 led by Czech Protestants against the King Ferdinand I, the citizens of Vimperk sided with the Czech Protestants. After Ferdinand's eventual triumph he gained Vimperk among his spoils. in 1553 he sold Vimperk to Jáchym of Hradec, but it was seized by William of Rosenberg. William's brother Peter Vok of Rosenberg (the last member of the Rosenberg family) sold the town in 1601 to Volf Novohradský of Kolovraty, who sided with the Czech Protestants during the rebellion of 1618. On 10 July 1619 Vimperk Castle was occupied by the imperial forces under Illow. On 22 and 23 October 1619, the castle and town were regained by Protestant forces under Arnošt of Mannsfeld, but the main castle was horribly damaged as a consequence of the battle.

Between 1622 and 1624 Jáchym Novohradský of Kolovraty built new castle buildings over portions of the castle that had been destroyed. This construction and other expensive activities ruined him financially so that he was forced in to sell the castle in 1630 to Oldřich, Count of Eggenberg. The Eggenberg family owned Vimperk Castle until 1719, when the House of Eggenberg died out and all of the Eggenberg holdings, including Český Krumlov manor, fell to the Schwarzenberg family.

In 1857 the town of Vimperk suffered yet another fire which caused extensive damage to many of the buildings on the main town square. Emperor Franz Joseph I visited Vimperk to see the extent of the damage and authorized imperial funding to assist with repairs and reconstruction.

In 1938 the German military, by order of the German Nazi government, expelled all non-Germanic persons from Vimperk claiming it was Sudeten German territory. At the end of World War II, all German people were expelled from Vimperk.

In 1945 American Allied Forces liberated the town of Vimperk, which is commemorated by a plaque in the centre of Vimperk.

In the 19th century, Vimperk became an industrial centre of the Bohemian Forest region. The industrial character of the town remained in years 1945–1989. After 1989, the industry began to decline and many businesses closed. The town began to focus more on tourism.

Demographics

Economy
The largest employer based in the town is a branch of the Rohde & Schwarz company, which is a manufacturer of electrical devices. It has more than 900 employees and belongs to the largest employers in the entire region.

Sights

The Vimperk Castle is the main landmark of the town. The Schwarzenberg family was the last private proprietor of the castle. In 1947, the Vimperk Castle was nationalized by the Czechoslovak state. Since 2015, it has been owned by the National Heritage Institute. A part of the property serves as a museum, and the headquarters of the Šumava National Park and Šumava Protected Landscape Area are also located there.

There are three churches in Vimperk: Church of Saint Bartholomew, Church of the Visitation of the Virgin Mary, and Church of the Most Sacred Heart of Jesus. Church of Saint Bartholomew is oldest sacral building in the town. It was built in the second half of the 13th century in its today's form is in the pseudo-Gothic style. The Church of the Visitation of the Virgin Mary is located on the town square and since its construction it has been the spiritual centre of Vimperk. It was built in the 14th century, before 1365.

Notable people
Adam Franz of Schwarzenberg (1680–1732), repaired the Vimperk Castle and renovated some buildings in Baroque style
Albert Popper (1808–1889), mayor of Vimperk
Tereza Huříková (born 1987), road cyclist and mountain biker
Šimon Hrubec (born 1991), ice hockey player

Twin towns – sister cities

Vimperk is twinned with:
 Freyung, Germany

References

External links

Cities and towns in the Czech Republic
Populated places in Prachatice District
Prácheňsko
Bohemian Forest